Nigel John Pegrum (born 22 January 1949) is a music producer and former drummer, most known for playing on many albums by Steeleye Span.

Biography 
Nigel Pegrum played drums with an early line-up of the Small Faces, then with Lee Grant And The Capitols before joining Spice, who subsequently changed their name to Uriah Heep and replaced him with a drummer who had a heavier style of playing, but not before recording the "Lansdowne Tapes". These sessions have since been released under the Uriah Heep name, and feature Pegrum on drums on some tracks. He then joined the art-rock/prog-rock band Gnidrolog, where he was able to use his ability on the flute and oboe. He recorded two studio albums with them, plus a live album before playing with Halcyon and then living on a commune in Worcestershire in 1973. Steeleye Span had finally decided to use a full-time drummer and invited him to join them. Two weeks later he was touring America, with them as the supporting act for Jethro Tull. He remained with Steeleye Span for 17 years, then moved to Australia where he has recorded world-beat albums with aboriginal musicians. He rejoined Steeleye Span for a one-off project, titled The Journey, in 1995.

In 1979, Pegrum joined up with Steeleye Span bassist Rick Kemp to create Plant Life Records. A third member of Steeleye Span, Maddy Prior, released one of her albums on the label. The label's most successful recordings were with the Tannahill Weavers. Pegrum was producer of over 30 albums on the label, which closed down in 1984. He has been a session drummer for June Tabor, Wizz Jones, Rosie Hardman and John Otway. He worked as a freelance producer before emigrating to Australia, where he works with Australian Sun Records.

Both Pegrum and Rick Kemp were members of the punk parody band the Pork Dukes in 1977, using pseudonyms.

Pegrum produced two albums of the German folk band Lorbass (Wie es uns gefällt in 1979 and Wohl bekomm's in 1981, both on Burlington Records) on which he played drums as a guest musician.

In 1980, he joined up with the German band Stenderband with Stefan Stoppok. He recorded one album, titled Erfrischungen.

In 1982, he played the drums on the album Drucksache with the German band Bernie's Autobahn Band.

Pegrum now operates his own recording studio, Pegasus Studios, in Whitfield, a suburb of Cairns, Queensland.

References 

English drummers
British male drummers
English record producers
Steeleye Span members
Living people
1949 births
British folk rock musicians
Place of birth missing (living people)